Michał Marian Siedlecki (8 September 1873, in Kraków – 11 January 1940, in Sachsenhausen concentration camp) was a Polish zoologist.

Biography
In 1891 he graduated from St. George High School (Gimnazjum św. Jacka) in Krakow. In the years 1891-1895 he studied zoology at the Jagiellonian University in Kraków, followed by supplementary studies at the Berlin Zoological Institute (1895-1896) and the Collège de France and the Institut Pasteur at the University of Paris.

In 1895 he received the title of Doctor of Philosophy, and in 1899 he was Associate Professor of Zoology. In 1904 he became an associate professor. In 1912 he became head of the Department of Zoology at the university. In the years 1919-1921 he was rector of the Stefan Batory University in Vilnius. In 1921 he returned to the Jagiellonian University. He studied general biology and marine biology.

In 1921, he was co-initiator of the creation of the Maritime Fishery Laboratory on Hel and the Warsaw Birds Research Station in Warsaw in 1931. He represented Poland at the International Council for the Exploration of the Sea in Copenhagen and the International Bureau for Nature Conservation in Brussels. He participated in scientific expeditions to Egypt, India, Africa, Ceylon and Java. In the years 1923-1938 he was a member of the State Council for Nature Conservation.

In research he dealt with protozoology, cytology and marine biology. He also conducted research in the field of marine biology and created a rational basis for marine fisheries. He fought for the protection of rare animals, including bison, whales, sturgeon, and many bird species. He led a comprehensive study of adaptation mechanisms of animals to tropical conditions. Together with Franciszek Krzyształowicz, he studied the pathogenesis of syphilis and Treponema pallidum, and he helped explain the pathogenesis of malaria with Fritz Schaudinn.

In 1903 he became a correspondent of the Academy of Skills and in 1920 he was an active member of the Polish Academy of Arts. He was also a member of the Warsaw Scientific Society. He was Doctor honoris causa of universities in Vilnius and Strasbourg.

After the beginning of the German occupation in Poland, he was arrested on November 6, 1939, in the Sonderaktion Krakau. He died on January 11, 1940, in the Sachsenhausen camp. An urn with the professor's ashes arrived in Kraków, where it was placed in the Rakowicki Cemetery. A Polish Oceanographic Research Ship was named for him ("RV Profesor Siedlecki").

He was the author of many scientific and popular science papers and a number of special hearings, especially in the field of sporulation research.

1873 births
1940 deaths
Burials at Rakowicki Cemetery
Members of the Lwów Scientific Society
Members of the Polish Academy of Learning
20th-century Polish zoologists
Rectors of Vilnius University